Robert Michael Bilton (14 December 1919 – 5 November 1993) was an English actor best known for his roles in the British television sitcoms To the Manor Born (playing the gardener and sometime butler Ned) and Waiting for God (playing Basil, a septuagenarian satyr).

Early life
He attended Hymers College, Hull. In the Second World War he was commissioned as a Second Lieutenant and was wounded at the Battle of El Alamein. After his recovery he began his acting career in repertory theatre.

Career
He had a strong comedic bent and featured in Keeping Up Appearances, One Foot in the Grave and Grace and Favour (1992). He also appeared in Brideshead Revisited, Pennies From Heaven, The Saint, The Avengers, The Prisoner, Quatermass II, The Champions,  the doorman at a hotel in Terry and June, in the Doctor Who stories, The Massacre of St Bartholomew's Eve, Pyramids of Mars and The Deadly Assassin, Wodehouse Playhouse, (as Malay, the Butler), Dads Army (as Mr Maxwell, the solicitor), "The Adventure of Shoscombe Olde Place" episode of The Case-Book of Sherlock Holmes; (also notable in the cast was Jude Law as an aspiring jockey). Bilton's film appearances included A Taste of Honey (1961), The Thirty Nine Steps (1978) and The Fourth Protocol (1987), as Kim Philby.

Bilton appeared in a well-remembered Yellow Pages television commercial as an elderly gardener receiving a sit-on lawnmower from a couple with a large rear garden. The male half of the couple was played by David Hargreaves, who also appeared in the BBC drama series Juliet Bravo.

Bilton's final role was that of Basil Makepeace in the BBC Sitcom Waiting for God; when filming began in 1990 he was already aged 71. Basil grew in importance throughout the first four series eventually becoming the main supporting character. His final appearance was in the last episode of Series 4. He died shortly after completing filming.

In the Christmas episode 1993, his absence was explained by his character having gone on an "Icelandic wife-swapping cruise" and he is not mentioned again. The character of Basil was essentially "replaced" by Jamie Edwards, Jane's spirited Irish grandfather, who was played by Paddy Ward.

Personal life and death
Bilton was married and divorced twice, first to Sally West from 1944 and later to actress Valerie Newbold, from 1953 until 1967. Bilton died on 5 November 1993 in Berkhamsted, Hertfordshire.

Filmography

References

External links

Michael Bilton at British Film Institute

1919 births
1993 deaths
People from Cottingham, East Riding of Yorkshire
People from Berkhamsted
English male film actors
English male television actors
Male actors from Yorkshire
20th-century English male actors
British Army personnel of World War II
British Army officers